The 2009 Rakuten Japan Open Tennis Championships was a men's tennis tournament played on outdoor hard courts. It was the 36th edition of the event known that year as the Rakuten Japan Open Tennis Championships, and was part of the 500 Series of the 2009 ATP World Tour. It was held at the Ariake Coliseum in Tokyo, Japan, from October 5 through October 11, 2009. Second-seeded Jo-Wilfried Tsonga won the singles title.

ATP entrants

Seeds

 rankings are based on the rankings of September 28, 2009

Other entrants
The following players received wildcards into the singles main draw:
  Tatsuma Ito
  Go Soeda
  Takao Suzuki

The following players received entry from the qualifying draw:
  Marco Chiudinelli
  Ernests Gulbis
  Marsel İlhan
  Édouard Roger-Vasselin

Finals

Singles

 Jo-Wilfried Tsonga defeated  Mikhail Youzhny, 6–3, 6–3
 It was Tsongas 3rd title of the year and 5th of his career.

Doubles

 Julian Knowle /  Jürgen Melzer defeated  Ross Hutchins /  Jordan Kerr, 6–2, 5–7, [10–8]

References

External links
 Official website
 ATP tournament profile

Rakuten Japan Open Tennis Championships
Japan Open (tennis)
Tennis Championships
 
Rakuten Japan Open Tennis Championships